This is an incomplete list of Indian politicians who were assassinated.

See also
List of assassinations in Asia#India
List of assassination attempts on prime ministers of India

References

Assassinated
India
Assassinated politicians
Assassinations in India